Union was a ship that first appeared in records in 1799. She made one voyage as a slave ship in the triangular trade in enslaved people but foundered on her way home.

Career
Union appeared in the 1800 volume of the Register of Shipping (RS).

Captain Thomas Moffat acquired a letter of marque on 9 December 1799. Captain Thomas Mollett sailed Union from London on 26 December 1799. Union acquired captives at Accra and arrived at Demerara on 30 October 1800 with 384 captives.

Both were enslaving ships with letters of marque. All were carrying  sugar, coffee, indigo, and cotton. During the voyage Union started to take on water so her crew transferred to Bolton. Then Bolton and Dart parted company in a gale. (Dart arrived back at Liverpool on 11 March.)

On 5 March 1801 Bolton encountered the French privateer Gironde. Gironde was armed with 26 guns and had a complement of 260 men; reportedly, Bolton had 70 people (including passengers - presumably most of them the crew from Union), aboard her. Small arms fire from Gironde helped her overwhelm Boltons defences; Gironde then ran into Bolton and captured her. The engagement, which lasted about an hour, caused considerable damage to both ships. Two passengers on Bolton were killed, and six of her crew, including Captain Watson, were wounded; Gironde had no casualties.
 
On 12 March  recaptured Bolton, as Bolton was on her way to Bordeaux. Leda sent Bolton into Plymouth. Bolton arrived at Plymouth on 14 March.

Notes

Citations

References
 
 

1790s ships
Age of Sail merchant ships of England
London slave ships
Maritime incidents in 1801